Arnaldo Joaquim Castro Abrantes (born 18 December 1961) is a Portuguese sprinter. He competed in the men's 4 × 100 metres relay at the 1988 Summer Olympics.

References

External links

1961 births
Living people
Athletes (track and field) at the 1988 Summer Olympics
Portuguese male sprinters
Olympic athletes of Portugal
Place of birth missing (living people)